The 1956 Wellington City mayoral election was part of the New Zealand local elections held that same year. In 1956, elections were held for the Mayor of Wellington plus other local government positions including fifteen city councillors. The polling was conducted using the standard first-past-the-post electoral method.

Background
The 1956 mayoral election was conducted amidst a selection controversy by the right-leaning Citizens' Association. Under the impression that incumbent mayor Robert Macalister was not intending to seek a third term as Mayor, Ernest Toop applied to gain nomination as the official Citizens' candidacy. As Toop was the only applicant he was successful. However, Macalister had intended to run for mayor again and assumed he, as incumbent, would gain automatic nomination. Undeterred, Macalister ran for mayor again as an Independent which split the Citizens' vote enabling Labour's Frank Kitts to win the mayoralty. Kitts became Wellington's first Labour Mayor in 46 years following David McLaren's defeat in 1913.

Labour also polled more votes than the Citizens' Association for the council as well. However it won fewer seats due to a high concentration of Labour votes on several candidates with the remainder of the ticket receiving far less, compared to the Citizens' vote which was more evenly dispersed across its ticket. This was compounded due to Kitts running jointly for both mayor and council. He topped the poll in the council vote, but his election was voided by virtue of winning the mayoralty which saw his council seat awarded to the highest polling unsuccessful candidate, Donald Griffin, who was on the Citizens' ticket. Initially it was to be awarded to another Labour candidate, Thomas Cameron, but after special votes had been counted Griffin has surpassed Cameron's tally.

Mayoralty results

Councillor results

 
 
 
 
 
 
 
 
 
 
 
 
 
 
 
 
 
 
 
  
 
 
  
 
  
 
 
 
 
 
 
 
 
 
 
 
 

Table footnotes:

Notes

References

Mayoral elections in Wellington
1956 elections in New Zealand
Politics of the Wellington Region
1950s in Wellington
November 1956 events in New Zealand